Enciastraia (French: Tête de l'Enchastraye) is a mountain in the Maritime Alps, on the boundary between the province of Cuneo (Piedmont, northern Italy) and the French region of Provence-Alpes-Côte-d'Azur.

SOIUSA classification 
According to the SOIUSA (International Standardized Mountain Subdivision of the Alps) the mountain can be classified in the following way:
 main part = Western Alps
 major sector = South Western Alps
 section = Maritime Alps
 subsection = (Fr:Alpes Maritimes d.l.s.l./It:Alpi Marittime)
 supergroup = (Fr:Chaîne Corborant-Ténibre-Enchastraye/It:Catena Corborant-Tenibres-Enciastraia)
 group = (Fr:Massif Enchastraye-Siguret/It:Gruppo Enciastraia-Siguret) 
 subgroup = (Fr:Groupe de l'Enchastraye/It:Gruppo dell'Enciastraia)
 code = I/A-2.1-C.12.a

References

Sources

Maps
 Italian official cartography (Istituto Geografico Militare - IGM); on-line version: www.pcn.minambiente.it
 French  official cartography (Institut Géographique National - IGN); on-line version:  www.geoportail.fr

Mountains of Piedmont
Mountains of the Alps
Mountains of Alpes-Maritimes
Two-thousanders of Italy
Two-thousanders of France
France–Italy border
International mountains of Europe
Mountains partially in France